Parliamentary elections were held in Portugal on 30 March 1890. The result was a victory for the Regeneration Party, which won 115 seats.

Results

The results exclude the six seats won at national level and those from overseas territories.

References

Legislative elections in Portugal
1890 elections in Europe
1890 elections in Portugal
March 1890 events